Guru Gobind Singh College of Modern Technology is a private college located at Kharar, Punjab, India. The college curriculum focuses on undergraduate and postgraduate engineering and business management studies. The college is privately supported and is affiliated to the Punjab Technical University, Jalandhar. It is recognized by the All India Council for Technical Education, New Delhi and the government of Punjab. The college is promoted by Shri Guru Gobind Singh Foundation, Mohali.

Festivals
College has organized a festival named "Parhelion '09." It was a technical cum social fest with fashion show and rock battle as the major attractions.

Location
The campus is located at Chandigarh-Ludhiana Highway, near Kharar, District Mohali, on the outskirts of Chandigarh. The campus is 16 km from Chandigarh.

Programs

Diploma programs
 Computer Science and Engineering (CSE)
 Electronics and Communication Engineering (ECE)
 Information Technology (IT)
 Mechanical Engineering (ME)
 Electrical Engineering (EE)
 Civil engineering(CE)

Undergraduate programs

 Computer Science and Engineering (CSE)
 Electronics and Communication Engineering (ECE)
 Information Technology (IT)
 Mechanical Engineering (ME)
 Electrical Engineering (EE)
 Bachelor of Computer Applications (BCA)

Postgraduate programs
 Master of Computer Applications (MCA)
 Master of Business Administration (MBA)
 Master of Technology (M.Tech)

Admissions
The admission towards a full-time Bachelor of Technology degree in GGS College of Modern Technology is through Combined Entrance Test (CET) conducted by the Punjab Technical University.

External links
 
 Punjab Technical University

Engineering colleges in Punjab, India
Memorials to Guru Gobind Singh
Educational institutions established in 2002
2002 establishments in Punjab, India